Coleophora heringi is a moth of the family Coleophoridae. It is found in Turkey.

References

heringi
Endemic fauna of Turkey
Moths described in 1952
Moths of Asia